{{Infobox person
| name               = Filippos Tsitos
| image              = 
| alt                = 
| caption            = 
| birth_name         = 
| birth_date         = 
| birth_place        = Kypseli, Athens, Greece
| death_date         = 
| death_place        = 
| nationality        = Greek
| other_names        = 
| occupation         = Film director
| years_active       = 
| known_for          = 'Unfair World| notable_works      = 
}}

Filippos Tsitos (born 1966 in Kypseli) is a Greek film and television director who works in German and Greece. He grew up in Exarchia and Chalandri, moving to Berlin, Germany in 1991, where he studied directing at the German Academy of Cinema and Television. He has won the Silver Shell Award at the San Sebastian International Film Festival for his film Unfair World.

Selected works
 Tatort (2002–2010) 
 Plato's Academy (2009)
 Unfair World'' (2011)

References

External links
 

1966 births
Living people
Greek film directors
Greek screenwriters
Film people from Athens
People from Athens